The University of Namur or Université de Namur (UNamur), in Namur (Belgium), is a Jesuit, Catholic private university in the French Community of Belgium. Both teaching and research are carried out in six Faculties or university level schools in the fields of:
 Philosophy and Lettres
 Law
 Economic, Social, and Management Sciences
 Computer Sciences
 Sciences
 Medicine

Geography and location 
The University of Namur is located in Namur, Belgium. The main campus is located at the heart of the city of Namur, capital of Wallonia. The main university campus includes the university building, the six main faculties and the university libraries.

History

Foundation 1831-1846 
In the spring of 1831, the Society of Jesus reopened a high school in what was earlier the Our-Lady of Peace Benedictine abbey, in Namur. The school immediately developed into a college with the support of prominent Namurian families. They put some conditions in order to finance the new project, the most important is teaching other sciences such as philosophy with the liberty of education as proclaimed by the new Belgian Constitution.

First expansions (1846-1928) 
Many expansions took place in this period, the number of students increased gradually, new sciences and study programmes were introduced.

Sensible progress (1929-1947) 
A New Belgian law excluded the institution from getting financial support from the government. This pushed the ambitious university to rely on its own sources and funds. Despite this, in 1934, many projects were launched: new building specific to physical and chemical studies, the expansion of Belles-Lettres library, modernization of some laboratories, many new titles were added to the seminars library.

Resuming the expansion (1948-1970) 
On February 18, 1948, the institution, formerly a college, changed its status to that of a university. This new status resulted in having some (limited and irregular) financial aid from the government.

Starting in 1960, after the introduction of new national financing laws, government aid increased and became regular. Many new projects and programmes came into being, improving the university's national and European visibility.

The big expansion (1971-1991) 
The university launched many important projects:
1971: Institute of Computer Science (now called Faculty of Computer Science): the first of its kind in Belgium and one of the leading institutions in Europe.
1972: Faculty of Law.
1974: Faculty of Sciences, Faculty of Medicine.
1979: New university library Moretus Plantin (more than 800,000 title at the time).
1990: Construction of Pedro Arrupe new amphitheater.
2015 : New amphitheater Vauban
2014-2017 : New Faculty of Sciences

Prospects 

On June 29, 2003, the University of Namur joined with three other French-speaking Catholic universities to form the Académie Louvain. These are the University of Louvain (UCLouvain), located in Louvain-La-Neuve; Saint-Louis University, Brussels (now UCLouvain Saint-Louis - Bruxelles), located in Brussels and Ixelles; and the Facultés universitaires catholiques de Mons, (FUCaM, now UCLouvain FUCaM Mons) located in Mons and Charleroi (now UCLouvain Charleroi).

Explorations developed in 2007 for combining all four institutions into a single university, and an agreement was reached to create a new university to be called Université catholique de Louvain (Académie Louvain Project). Campuses might be identified as UCL/Brussels (today UCLouvain Bruxelles), UCL/Namur (today UCLouvain Namur), UCL/Louvain-la-Neuve, UCL/Mons (today UCLouvain FUCaM Mons) and UCL/Charleroi (today UCLouvain Charleroi). However, in December 2010 negotiations for a full merger were aborted by an insufficient vote by the general assembly of Facultés Universitaires Notre-Dame de la Paix (FUNDP).

The "Academie Louvain" ceased to exist in 2014 due to the entry in force of the new law organising the universities.

Education

1. Faculty of Philosophy and Letters

Bachelors degree (Three years) 
 Philosophy
 History
 Art History and Archeology
 French and Romance Languages and Literatures
 Germanic Languages and Literatures

Doctoral studies 
 Philosophy
 History, Art History and Archaeology
 Languages and Literatures (Romance, Germanic and Greek classics)

2. Faculty of Law

Bachelor degree (Three years) 
 law

Doctoral studies 
 Legal Sciences

3. Faculty of Medicine

Bachelor degree (Three Years) 
 Medicine
 Biomedical Sciences
 Pharmacy

Master degree (Two Years) 
 Biomedical Sciences

Doctoral studies

4. Faculty of Economics, Social Sciences and Management

Bachelor degree (Three years) 
 Economics and Management
 Business Engineering
 Political Science
 Information and Communication

Master degree (Two years) 
 Economics
 Management
 Business Engineering
 Business Engineering, with focus on "Information systems management"
 Business Engineering, with focus on "Data Science"

Doctoral studies 
 Economics
 Finance & Markets
 Accounting and Control
 Marketing
 Business Law and Tax Management
 Management (Business Administration & Entrepreneurship-Intrapreneurship / Strategic Management & Corporate Governance / Human Resource Management)
 Management Science (Operation Research / Supply Chain Management)
 Information Systems Management (Business IT)
 Political Science & International Relations
 Social Sciences
 Information and Communication

5. Faculty of Computer Science

Bachelor degree (Three years) 
 Computer Science

Master degree (Two years) 
 Computer Science, with a specialization in Software Engineering 
 Computer Science, with a specialization in Data science

Master degree (One year) 
 Computer Science

Specialization master degree (One year) 
 Informatics and innovation (business analysis and IT governance)

Doctoral studies 
 Computer Science

6. Faculty of Sciences

Bachelor degree (Three years) 
 Mathematics
 Physics
 Chemistry
 Biology
 Geology
 Geography
 Veterinary Medicine

Master degree 
 Mathematics
 Mathematics, with focus on "Data Science"
 Physics
 Chemistry
 Biochemistry and molecular and cell biology
 Biology of organisms and ecology

Advanced master in 
 Aquaculture (organized with the Université de Liège)
 Transportation Management (organized mainly with the Université Libre de Bruxelles)

Doctoral studies 
 Science
 Veterinary Sciences

Faculties and libraries 

 Faculty of Sciences
 Faculty of Economics, Social Sciences and Management 
 Faculty of Computer Science
 Faculty of Law
 Faculty of Medicine
 Faculty of Philosophy and Letters

 Education and Technology Department
 Living Languages School
 Moretus Plantin University Library
 Law Faculty Library
 Documentation Center & Religious Research library

Academic Profiles

The university is included in some major world university rankings: the U.S. News & World Report Best Global University Ranking of 2021 lists University of Namur as 1436th in the world, and the Center for World University Rankings of 2020-2021 lists the university as 1201st in the world.

Notable alumni 
 André Antoine, Belgian politician and French Community of Belgium Minister for finance
 Mathias Cormann, politician and Australia's Minister for finance
 Jean-Luc Dehaene, Prime Minister
 Catherine Fonck, Belgian politician and former French Community of Belgium Health Minister
 Georges Jacobs, businessman, Chairman of the Board of Directors of UCB Group and Chairman of the Board of Directors of Delhaize Group, Honorary Chairman of UNICE
Oly Ilunga Kalenga, Minister of Health in the Democratic Republic of the Congo.
 Koen Lenaerts, Professor of Law and Judge at the European Court of Justice
 Philippe Maystadt, former Belgian minister and 2000-2011 President of the European Investment Bank
 Petra Rudolf, solid-state physicist and Past-President of the European Physical Society
 Jean-François van Boxmeer, CEO of Heineken International
 Andries Van den Abeele, historian, historical preservationist, politician and entrepreneur
 Jacques van Ypersele de Strihou, literature, private secretary of the King of Belgium

Notes and references

See also 
 Académie Louvain
 CeReFiM (Center for Research in Finance and Management)
 Crealys Science Park
 Education in Belgium
 List of Jesuit sites
 List of universities in Belgium
 PReCISE (Research Center in Information Systems Engineering)
 Tocqueville Chair in Security Policies
 Science and technology in Wallonia
 Science Parks of Wallonia

External links

 

 
Jesuit universities and colleges
Educational institutions established in 1831
1831 establishments in Belgium
Buildings and structures in Namur (city)